Jasmine (taxonomic name: Jasminum;) is a genus of shrubs and vines in the olive family (Oleaceae). It contains around 200 species native to tropical and warm temperate regions of Eurasia, Africa, and Oceania. Jasmines are widely cultivated for the characteristic fragrance of their flowers. A number of unrelated plants contain the word "jasmine" in their common names (see Other plants called "jasmine").

Description

Jasmine can be either deciduous (leaves falling in autumn) or evergreen (green all year round), and can be erect, spreading, or climbing shrubs and vines. Their leaves are borne in opposing or alternating arrangement and can be of simple, trifoliate, or pinnate formation. They are white or yellow, although in rare instances they can be slightly reddish. The flowers are borne in cymose clusters with a minimum of three flowers, though they can also be solitary on the ends of branchlets. Each flower has about four to nine petals, two locules, and one to four ovules. They have two stamens with very short filaments. The bracts are linear or ovate. The calyx is bell-shaped. They are usually very fragrant. The fruits of jasmines are berries that turn black when ripe. The basic chromosome number of the genus is 13, and most species are diploid (2n=26). However, natural polyploidy exists, particularly in Jasminum sambac (triploid 3n=39), Jasminum flexile (tetraploid 4n=52), Jasminum mesnyi (triploid 3n=39), and Jasminum angustifolium (tetraploid 4n=52).

Distribution and habitat
Jasmines are native to tropical and subtropical regions of Eurasia, Africa, Australasia and Oceania, although only one of the 200 species is native to Europe. Their center of diversity is in South Asia and Southeast Asia.

Several jasmine species have become naturalized in Mediterranean Europe. For example, the so-called Spanish jasmine (Jasminum grandiflorum) was originally from West Asia, the Indian subcontinent, Northeast Africa, and East Africa, and is now naturalized in the Iberian peninsula.

Jasminum fluminense (which is sometimes known by the inaccurate name "Brazilian Jasmine") and Jasminum dichotomum (Gold Coast Jasmine) are invasive species in Hawaii and Florida. Jasminum polyanthum, also known as White Jasmine, is an invasive weed in Australia.

Taxonomy
Species belonging to the genus are classified under the tribe Jasmineae of the olive family (Oleaceae). Jasminum is divided into five sections—Alternifolia, Jasminum, Primulina, Trifoliolata, and Unifoliolata.

Etymology 
The name  is derived from the Middle Persian word . Through Arabic the name entered Ottoman Turkish and then to Middle French around 1570. The word was first used in English in the 16th century.

Species

Species include:

 J. abyssinicum Hochst. ex DC. – forest jasmine
 J. adenophyllum Wall. – bluegrape jasmine, pinwheel jasmine, princess jasmine
 J. andamanicum N.P.Balakr. & N.G.Nair
 J. angulare Vahl
 J. angustifolium (L.) Willd.
 J. auriculatum Vahl – Indian jasmine, needle-flower jasmine
 J. azoricum L.
 J. beesianum Forrest & Diels – red jasmine
 J. dichotomum Vahl – Gold Coast jasmine
 J. didymum G.Forst.
 J. dispermum Wall.
 J. elegans Knobl.
 J. elongatum (P.J.Bergius) Willd.
 J. floridum Bunge
 J. fluminense Vell.
 J. fruticans L.
 J. grandiflorum L. – Catalan jasmine, jasmin odorant, royal jasmine, Spanish jasmine
 J. grandiflorum L.Vell.
 J. humile L. – Italian jasmine, Italian yellow jasmine
 J. lanceolarium Roxb.
 J. laurifolium Roxb. ex Hornem. angel-wing jasmine
 J. malabaricum Wight
 J. mesnyi Hance – Japanese jasmine, primrose jasmine, yellow jasmine
 J. multiflorum (Burm.f.) Andrews – Indian jasmine, star jasmine, winter jasmine
 J. multipartitum Hochst. – starry wild jasmine
 J. nervosum Lour.
 J. nobile C.B.Clarke
 J. nudiflorum Lindl. – winter jasmine
 J. odoratissimum L. – yellow jasmine
 J. officinale L. – common jasmine, jasmine, jessamine, poet's jasmine, summer jasmine, white jasmine
 J. parkeri Dunn – dwarf jasmine
 J. polyanthum Franch.
 J. sambac (L.) Aiton – Arabian jasmine, Sambac jasmine
 J. simplicifolium G.Forst.
 J. sinense Hemsl.
 J. subhumile W.W.Sm.
 J. subtriplinerve Blume
 J. tortuosum Willd.
 J. urophyllum Hemsl.
 J. volubile Jacq..

Jasmonates

Jasmine lends its name to jasmonate plant hormones, as methyl jasmonate isolated from the oil of Jasminum grandiflorum led to the discovery of the molecular structure of jasmonates. Jasmonates occur ubiquitously across the plant kingdom, having key roles in responses to environmental cues, such as heat or cold stress, and participate in the signal transduction pathways of many plants.

Cultural importance

Jasmine is cultivated commercially for domestic and industrial uses, such as the perfume industry. It is used in rituals like marriages, religious ceremonies, and festivals. Jasmine flower vendors sell garlands of jasmine, or in the case of the thicker motiyaa (in Hindi) or mograa (in Marathi) varieties, bunches of jasmine are common. They may be found around entrances to temples, on major thoroughfares, and in major business areas.

A change in presidency in Tunisia in 1987 and the Tunisian Revolution of 2011 are both called "Jasmine revolutions" in reference to the flower.

"Jasmine" is a common female given name.

Symbolism
Several countries and states consider jasmine as a national symbol.

 Syria: The Syrian city Damascus is called the City of Jasmine.
 Hawaii: Jasminum sambac ("pikake") is a common flower used in leis and is the subject of many Hawaiian songs.
 Indonesia: Jasminum sambac is the national flower, adopted in 1990. It goes by the name "melati putih" and is used in wedding ceremonies for ethnic Indonesians, especially on the island of Java.
 Pakistan: Jasminum officinale is known as the "chambeli" or "yasmin", it is the national flower.
 Philippines: Jasminum sambac is the national flower. Adopted in 1935, it is known as "sampaguita" in the islands. It is usually strung in garlands which are then used to adorn religious images.
 Thailand: Jasmine flowers are used as a symbol of motherhood.
 Tunisia: The national flower of Tunisia is jasmine. It was chosen as a symbol for the 2010 Tunisian Revolution.

Other plants called "jasmine"
 
Brazilian jasmine Mandevilla sanderi 
Cape jasmine Gardenia
Carolina jasmine Gelsemium sempervirens
Crape jasmine Tabernaemontana divaricata
Chilean jasmine Mandevilla laxa
Jasmine rice, a type of long-grain rice
Madagascar jasmine Stephanotis floribunda
New Zealand jasmine Parsonsia capsularis
Night-blooming jasmine Cestrum nocturnum 
Night-flowering jasmine Nyctanthes arbor-tristis
Orange jasmine Murraya paniculata 
Red jasmine Plumeria rubra
Star jasmine, Confederate jasmine Trachelospermum 
Tree jasmine (disambiguation)

References

Further reading

External links

 
 

 
Flora of Samoa
Garden plants
Incense material
Oleaceae genera
Taxa named by Carl Linnaeus